Stipe Balajić (born 27 September 1968) is a Croatian professional football manager and former player.

Club career
Balajić began his career in NK Junak Sinj. In 1992, he played for NK Zadar where he played in the Croatian first division, Prva HNL. During the next season he signed for HNK Hajduk Split where he played until 1994 when he returned to Zadar where he stayed for couple of months. His next stop in his career was NK Istra where he played for a season and a half until he joined HNK Šibenik in 1997. In total Balajić earned 136 appearances in the Croatian first division, scoring 15 goals in the process.

After time spent in Prva HNL he joined his first and only club abroad, the Slovenian side NK Maribor, where he had his best years. He played in Maribor for eight seasons up until his retirement in 2005. In 2002, he almost left the club but then returned after two months to help the team that already had financial difficulties at that time. According to his wishes he has played the first part of the season without payment from the club. In his last couple of seasons he was also the team captain.

He had his best moments in Maribor during the 1999–2000 season, when he led the team through qualifications for the elite UEFA Champions League where the team eventually qualified and played in. Balajić scored an important goal in the second leg of the third qualifying round against Olympique Lyonnais, which was won by Maribor 3–0 on aggregate. He then played for the team in group stages and scored one of two Maribor goals in the process, against FC Dynamo Kyiv. Maribor obtained four points and finished last in Group A.

Balajić finished his career as a player in 2005 when he has played his last match for Maribor in a friendly against Hajduk Split. He played his last match for the first 19 minutes of the match and was then substituted. In his honour the club has retired the jersey with the number 19, the only number to be retired in history of the club. He has earned a total of 176 appearances for Maribor in the Slovenian PrvaLiga, where he scored 29 goals in the process. Overall, Balajić played a total of 230 official matches and scored 37 goals for Maribor in all competitions.

Managerial career
After his football career, Balajić turned into managing. He started his managerial career as an assistant manager. His first job as manager started in 2007 when he accepted the offer from 3. HNL team NK Zagora Unešić. After finishing the season in second place, Balajić took the job as manager of 2. HNL team NK Solin, where he stayed until 2010. In June 2010, Balajić became the assistant manager at RNK Split.

In 2013, he became manager of the HNK Hajduk Split under-19 squad. He was sacked from the job in 2014. After one year at Hajduk Split, Balajić became the manager of NK Dugopolje once again on 8 August 2014 but only one month later, he resigned.

In January 2019, Balajić was appointed as the manager of Dugopolje for the third time.

References

External links
 
 

1968 births
Living people
People from Sinj
Association football defenders
Association football midfielders
Yugoslav footballers
Croatian footballers
NK Junak Sinj players
NK Zadar players
HNK Hajduk Split players
NK Istra players
HNK Šibenik players
NK Maribor players
Croatian Football League players
Slovenian PrvaLiga players
Croatian expatriate footballers
Expatriate footballers in Slovenia
Croatian expatriate sportspeople in Slovenia
Croatian football managers
NK Solin managers
NK Dugopolje managers
NK Imotski managers
HNK Šibenik managers
NK Krško managers
HŠK Posušje managers
Premier League of Bosnia and Herzegovina managers
Croatian expatriate football managers
Expatriate football managers in Slovenia
Expatriate football managers in Bosnia and Herzegovina
Croatian expatriate sportspeople in Bosnia and Herzegovina
HNK Hajduk Split non-playing staff